Union Junior/Senior High School is a small, public High School, located in Rimersburg, Clarion County. The school is part of the Union School District. The school campus is home to approximately 375 students and 30 Faculty Members. Students, at their choosing, have the opportunity to attend Clarion County Career Center if they desire to pursue a vocational trade.

Extracurriculars
Union School District offers students a variety of clubs, activities and sports. Beginning in 2016, Allegheny-Clarion Valley Junior/Senior High School entered into an athletic co-op agreement with Union Junior/Senior High School with regard to football, cross country, and golf. Under the agreement, Union High School would act as the host school for football (Though games are expected to be played at both schools evenly), while A-C is the host school for golf and cross-country.

Athletics
Union participates in PIAA District IX (9)

References 

Public high schools in Pennsylvania
Schools in Clarion County, Pennsylvania
Public middle schools in Pennsylvania